Farinata, socca, torta di ceci, or cecina is a type of thin, unleavened pancake or crêpe made from chickpea flour. It originated in Italy and later became a typical food of the Ligurian Sea coast, from Nice to Sardinia and Elba islands.  It is also typical in Gibraltar, where it is called calentita.

History
The origin of the dish is unknown. One origin-story says farinata was invented by a group of Roman soldiers who roasted chickpea-flour on a shield.

Names
In standard Italian, the dish is called farinata ("made of flour") while in Ligurian, specifically in the Genoese dialect, it goes by the name of fainâ . In Massa is called "calda calda" that means "hot hot". In Nice and the Côte d'Azur, it is called socca, in Tuscany, cecina ("made of chickpeas") or torta di ceci ("chickpea pie") and in Sardinia fainè. In Uruguay and Argentina it is massively popular and is called fainá.

Cooking method
It is made by stirring chickpea flour into a mixture of water and olive oil to form a loose batter, pouring it into a pan to make a pancake typically 4mm thick, and baking it for a few minutes, traditionally in an open oven in a tin-plated copper baking-pan. Farinata may be seasoned with fresh rosemary, pepper and sea salt. Traditionally farinata is cut into irregularly shaped triangular slices, and eaten (with no toppings) on small plates with optional black pepper. Elsewhere in Italy - traditionally in Tuscany, where it is called cecina (from the Italian word for chickpea, ceci) - it is served stuffed into small focaccia (mainly in Pisa) or between two slices of bread, as it is traditional in Livorno. It is sold in pizzerias and bakeries.

Italian variations
On the Tuscan coast, south of Liguria, especially in the province of Pisa, Livorno, Lucca cecina, in Massa Carrara "calda calda" or, in Livorno, torta (di ceci) is baked (with no rosemary used for toppings).

In Sassari, Sardinia, due to the historical ties with Genoa, la fainé genovese (genoese fainé), is a typical dish.

In Savona province (near Genoa), a version of farinata called  (white farinata) is used. It is made with wheat flour instead of chickpea flour.

The name panissa or paniscia in Genoese indicates a solidified boiled polenta-like paste, made with the same ingredients as farinata. It can be cut into strips and fried, called panissette.

In Genoa, variants of the farinata include sometimes onions or artichokes, but the most famous derivative recipe is the fainâ co i gianchetti ("farinata with whitebait"), at times hard to find due to fishing regulations, but traditionally seen as the quintessential fainâ.

French variations

 is also a specialty of southeastern French cuisine, particularly in and around the city of Nice, and is practically the same as farinata, some say the texture is a bit different. It may be baked on a tinned copper plate more than a meter in diameter.
Around Toulon and Marseille, it is also possible to find it under the name cade.
Panisse is a specialty of Marseille, and is a similar dish, but thicker, and is typically cut into rectangles and fried.

Elsewhere
In Algeria, karantita is a similar dish which is very popular. It is served hot and dressed with cumin and harissa.

In Argentina and Uruguay (where many thousands of Ligurian people emigrated between the 19th and the 20th centuries) farinata is known as fainá, similar to the original Genoese name fainâ. It is often eaten on top of pizza (a caballo).

In Uruguay, "el fainá" (called "la fainá" in Argentina) is considered a traditional Uruguayan dish, brought by immigrants in 1915, so much so that 27 August has been called "Fainá Day". Olive oil, which is expensive, is not necessarily used; other vegetable oils may be used, which affects the flavour to some extent.

In Gibraltar, where a significant portion of its population is of Genoese origin, it is known as calentita when it is baked or panissa when it is fried. They are typically eaten plain, without any toppings. These are considered to be Gibraltar's national dishes.

In India, the dal (the word for pulses) "chila" (pronounced "cheela") or besan (the word for chickpea flour) "puda" (pronounced "poora"), depending on the region, is a similar dish made by cooking chickpea (or another pulse) flour and water on an oiled skillet. Vegetables such as onions, green chillies, cabbage and herbs and spices such as coriander are also added in certain versions of the preparation.

See also
 List of pancakes
 Papadum
 Cuisine of Liguria
 List of Italian dishes

References

External links

Pancakes
Chickpea dishes
Cuisine of Liguria
Cuisine of Tuscany
French cuisine
Algerian cuisine
Argentine cuisine
Uruguayan cuisine
Gibraltarian culture
Cuisine of Sardinia
Street food in Italy